Flora Annie Steel (2 April 1847 – 12 April 1929) was a writer who lived in British India for 22 years. She was noted especially for books set in the Indian sub-continent or connected with it. Her novel On the Face of the Waters (1896) describes incidents in the Indian Mutiny.

Personal life
She was born Flora Annie Webster at Sudbury Priory, Sudbury, Middlesex, the sixth child of George Webster. Her mother, Isabella MacCallum, was an heiress. In 1867 she married Henry William Steel, a member of the Indian Civil Service, and they lived in India until 1889, chiefly in the Punjab, with which most of her books are connected. She grew deeply interested in native Indian life and began to urge educational reforms on the government of India. Mrs Steel herself became an Inspectress of Government and Aided Schools in the Punjab and also worked with John Lockwood Kipling, Rudyard Kipling's father, fostering Indian arts and crafts. When her husband's health was weak, Flora Annie Steel took over some of his responsibilities.

She died at her daughter's house in Minchinhampton, Gloucestershire on 12 April 1929. Her biographers include Violet Powell and Daya Patwardhan.

Writing
Flora was interested in relating to all classes of Indian society. The birth of her daughter gave her a chance to interact with local women and learn their language. She encouraged the production of local handicrafts and collected folk-tales, a collection of which she published in 1894.

Her interest in schools and the education of women gave her insight into native life and character. A year before leaving India, she co-authored and published The Complete Indian Housekeeper and Cook, which gave detailed directions to European women on all aspects of household management in India.

In 1889 the family moved back to Britain, and she continued her writing there. Some of her best work, according to the 1911 Encyclopædia Britannica, is contained in two collections of her short stories, From the Five Rivers and Tales of the Punjab.

She also wrote a popular history of India. John F. Riddick describes Steel's The Hosts of the Lord as one of the "three significant works" produced by Anglo-Indian writers on Indian missionaries, along with The Old Missionary (1895) by William Wilson Hunter and Idolatry (1909) by Alice Perrin. Among her other literary associates in India was Bithia Mary Croker.

Bibliography

References

External links

Play 'Grand-dad' by Steel on Great War Theatre

1847 births
1929 deaths
Writers from Wembley
English short story writers
19th-century English novelists
20th-century English novelists
19th-century English historians
English tax resisters
Europeans in India
Feminism in India
19th-century British short story writers
20th-century British short story writers
19th-century British women writers
20th-century British women writers
British women historians
20th-century English historians